The Intertribal Council on Utility Policy, or Intertribal COUP, is a Native American nonprofit organization founded in 1994. It focuses on energy, telecommunications, and environmental issues affecting member tribes in North Dakota, South Dakota, Nebraska and Wyoming.

The fifteen tribal nations represented in COUP are:
Cheyenne River
Flandreau Santee
Lower Brulé
Mandan, Hidatsa, and Arikara Nations
Northern Arapaho
Omaha
Rosebud Sioux
Sisseton
Spirit Lake Tribe
Pine Ridge Sioux
Standing Rock Sioux
Yankton Sioux

Intertribal COUP owns a major stake in a company that markets carbon offsets and renewable energy credits and funds projects such as wind farms on Indian reservations.

See also
Council of Energy Resource Tribes

References 

Non-profit organizations based in South Dakota
Native American organizations